Babai may refer to:

Patriarchs of the Church of the East
 Babowai (fl. 457–484), executed for anti-Sassanid statements
 Babai of Seleucia-Ctesiphon (fl. 497–503), Patriarch of the Church of the East (the Persian Church), from 497 to 503
 Babai the Great (551–628), an early church father of the Church of the East

Other uses
 Babai (Pashtun tribe), a Pashtun tribe in the Pakistan, Afghanistan and India
 Babai (surname)
 Babai (film), a 2015 Kosovan film
 The Eight Hundred (八佰, Bābǎi), 2020 Chinese film
 Babai, Iran, a village in Fars Province, Iran
 Babai, Kohgiluyeh and Boyer-Ahmad, a village in Kohgiluyeh and Boyer-Ahmad Province, Iran
 Babai Hotel, 1992 Telugu film
 Babai River, river in Nepal's Dang, Salyan and Bardiya districts and India's Uttar Pradesh state, then joining the Ghaghara
 Babai Revolt, a revolt in the 13th century Turkey
 Babai (Swamp Taro), a root crop cultivated in Kiribati
 Babai Rural Municipality, a rural council in Nepal

See also 
 Baba (disambiguation)
 Babi (disambiguation)